Zoran Sretenović (5 August 1964 – 28 April 2022) was a Serbian basketball coach and player.

Playing career
Sretenović played for several clubs in his country and abroad, most notably with Jugoplastika/Pop 84 from Split where he won three European Champion Cups, usually in the starting lineup. In the third of those title games, in Paris against F.C. Barcelona, Sretenovic became the second of only three players, and the only European ever, to play all 40 minutes of a Final Four title game for the winning team. He also won championships and cups of Germany, four titles, two Cups and two Supercups of Yugoslavia.

National team career 
Sretenović was a member of the Yugoslavia national cadet team at the 1981 European Championship for Cadets in Greece. Over six tournament games, he averaged 7.0 points per game.

Sretenović was a member of the Yugoslavia national basketball team (representing SFR Yugoslavia) that won the gold medal at the 1991 FIBA European Championship in Rome, Italy. Over five tournament games, he averaged 3.8 points per game.

Sretenović was a member of the Yugoslavia national team (representing FR Yugoslavia) that won the gold medal at EuroBasket 1995 in Athens, Greece. Over three tournament games, he averaged 1.3 points and 1.3 assists per game.

Coaching career
Upon retiring, Sretenović entered into a coaching career.

In the 2001–02 season, he became head coach of KK Budućnost Podgorica. He was also the assistant coach to Željko Lukajić at KK Hemofarm in 2005. In 2007–08, he was the head coach of KK Igokea. From July to November 2008, he was the head coach of KK Vojvodina Srbijagas. He later worked in Polpharma Starogard Gdański and AZS Koszalin.

References

External links
 Zoran Sretenović at eurobasket.com

1964 births
2022 deaths
Basketball players from Belgrade
Brose Bamberg players
KK Borovica players
KK Budućnost coaches
KK Crvena zvezda players
KK Igokea coaches
KK Partizan players
KK Split players
KK Vojvodina Srbijagas coaches
KK Železničar Inđija coaches
OKK Beograd players
Olympique Antibes basketball players
Point guards
BKK Radnički players
Serbian expatriate basketball people in Bosnia and Herzegovina
Serbian expatriate basketball people in Croatia
Serbian expatriate basketball people in Germany
Serbian expatriate basketball people in France
Serbian expatriate basketball people in Montenegro
Serbian expatriate basketball people in Poland
Serbian men's basketball coaches
Serbian men's basketball players
Stal Ostrów Wielkopolski players